Huzenko, Guzenko or Gouzenko (Ukrainian or Russian: Гузенко) is a gender-neutral Ukrainian surname that may refer to
Andriy Huzenko (born 1973), Ukrainian football player and coach
Igor Gouzenko (1919–1982), cipher clerk for the Soviet Embassy to Canada who defected to Canada
Olha Huzenko (born 1956), Ukrainian rower

See also
 

Ukrainian-language surnames